The 1997–98 season was Birmingham City Football Club's 95th in the Football League. They finished in seventh position in the 24-team Division One, the second tier of the English football league system, missing out on the playoff places on goals scored. Needing to win their last game, at home to Charlton Athletic, and hope that Sheffield United failed to win theirs, Birmingham "were repeatedly foiled in this emotionally-charged game by a brilliant display from Charlton's goalkeeper" Saša Ilić; the game finished goalless. They entered the 1997–98 FA Cup at the third round, losing to Leeds United in the fifth, and entered the League Cup in the first round and lost to Arsenal in the third.

In August 1997, co-owner David Gold took up the post of chairman after Jack Wiseman's retirement.

Football League First Division

Match details

League table (part)

Note that goals scored took precedence over goal difference as a tiebreaker in the Football League.

Results summary

FA Cup

League Cup

Transfers

In

a. Purse joined from Oxford United in exchange for £600,000 and Kevin Francis, with Francis valued at £100,000.

Out

 Brackets round a club denote the player joined that club after his Birmingham City contract expired.
a. Valued at £100,000 in the deal in which Darren Purse joined Birmingham from Oxford United in exchange for £600,000 plus Francis.

Loan in

Loan out

Appearances and goals

Numbers in parentheses denote appearances as substitute.
Players with name struck through and marked  left the club during the playing season.
Players with names in italics and marked * were on loan from another club for the whole of their season with Birmingham.

See also
 List of Birmingham City F.C. seasons

Sources
 
 
 For match dates, league positions and results: 
 For lineups, appearances, goalscorers and attendances: Matthews (2010), Complete Record, pp. 430–431.
 For goal times: 
 For transfers: 
 For discipline: individual player pages linked from  Soccerbase omits details of the visit to Nottingham Forest, so cards received in that game are sourced from

References

Birmingham City F.C. seasons
Birmingham City